Mancinella is a genus of sea snails, marine gastropod mollusks in the family Muricidae, the murex snails or rock snails.

Species
Species within the genus Mancinella include:
 Mancinella alouina (Röding, 1798)
 Mancinella armigera Link, 1807
 Mancinella capensis (Petit de la Saussaye, 1852)
 † Mancinella dubia Selli, 1974 
 Mancinella echinata (Blainville, 1832)
 Mancinella echinulata (Lamarck, 1822)
 Mancinella grossa (Houart, 2001)
 Mancinella herberti (Houart, 1998)
 Mancinella lata (Kuroda, 1931)
 Mancinella marmorata (Pease, 1865)
 Mancinella siro (Kuroda, 1931)
 † Mancinella striolata (Bronn, 1831) 

Species brought into synonymy
 Mancinella aculeata Link, 1807: synonym of Mancinella alouina (Röding, 1798)
 Mancinella bufo (Lamarck, 1822): synonym of Purpura bufo Lamarck, 1822
 Mancinella deltoidea (Lamarck, 1822): synonym of Vasula deltoidea (Lamarck, 1822)
 Mancinella hippocastanum (Linnaeus, 1758): synonym of Thalessa virgata (Dillwyn, 1817)
 Mancinella kieneri [sic]: synonym of Mancinella kienerii (Deshayes, 1844): synonym of Reishia bitubercularis (Lamarck, 1822)
 Mancinella kienerii (Deshayes, 1844): synonym of Reishia bitubercularis (Lamarck, 1822)
 Mancinella mancinella (Linnaeus, 1758): synonym of Mancinella alouina (Röding, 1798)
 Mancinella mutabilis Link, 1807: synonym of Indothais lacera (Born, 1778)
 Mancinella squamosa (Pease, 1868): synonym of Semiricinula squamosa (Pease, 1868)
 Mancinella tuberosa (Röding, 1798): synonym of Menathais tuberosa (Röding, 1798)

References

 Claremont M., Vermeij G.J., Williams S.T. & Reid D.G. (2013) Global phylogeny and new classification of the Rapaninae (Gastropoda: Muricidae), dominant molluscan predators on tropical rocky seashores. Molecular Phylogenetics and Evolution 66: 91–102.

External links
 Link D.H.F. (1807-1808) Beschreibung der Naturalien-Sammlung der Universität zu Rostock. 1 Abt. [Part 1], pp. 1–50; 2 Abt. [Part 2], pp. 51–100; 3 Abt. [Part 3], pp. 101–165; Abt. 4 [Part 4],pp. 1–30; Abt. 5 [Part 5], pp. 1–38 [1808]; Abt. 6 [Part 6], pp. 1–38 [1808] Rostock, Adlers Erben

 
Rapaninae